Oyen Municipal Airport  is located  south of Oyen, Alberta, Canada.

References

External links
 AlbertaFirst.com - Oyen
Place to Fly on COPA's Places to Fly airport directory

Registered aerodromes in Alberta